Jasmina is the debut studio album by Montenegrin dance-pop recording artist Dado Polumenta. It was released in 2001 through the record label Best Records.

Track listing
Brodolom
14 godina
Jasmina
Mogao bih druže moj
Oči plave, kose crne
Biće bolje, biće bolje
Činim sve
Crnogorko
Ljetnja kiša
Divlja ruža
Kafana

External links
Jasmina at Discogs

2001 debut albums
Dado Polumenta albums